Guadalcanal Province is one of the nine provinces of Solomon Islands, consisting of the island of Guadalcanal. It is a 2,510 square mile (5,336 km2) island and is largely a jungle. Its name was given by Pedro de Ortega Valencia, born in the village of Guadalcanal, Seville, Spain. The national capital and largest city of the Solomon Islands, Honiara, is on the island; in July 1983 it was designated a  separately-administered Capital Territory and is no longer considered part of the province. The population of the province is 93,613 (2009), not including the capital territory. The population of the island (including Honiara) is 161,197 (as of 2021). Honiara serves as the provincial capital. The climate is rainforest tropical.

World War II
The island became the scene of the important Guadalcanal Campaign during World War II. The Office of Weapons Removal and Abatement in the Department of State's Bureau of Political-Military Affairs established an explosive ordnance disposal training program. It safely disposed of hundreds of items of UXO, and it trained police personnel to respond to EOD call-outs in the island's highly populated areas.

Administrative divisions
Guadalcanal Province is sub-divided into the following wards (population numbers come from the 2009 census):

 Guadalcanal Province (93,613)
Saghalu (6,429)
Tandai (14,995)
Malango (10,532)
Paripao (3,068)
Aola (4,065)
Savulei (3,003)
Tangarare (3,118)
Wanderer Bay (3,448)
Duidui (3,190)
Vatukulau (1,833)
Talise (1,716)
Avuavu (2,262)
Moli (3,696)
Tetekanji (1,111)
Birao (3,159)
Valasi (1,459)
Kolokarako (1,418)
Longgu (3,767)
East Tasimboko (7,438)
Vulolo (4,429)
West Ghaobata (4,962)
East Ghaobata (4,515)

References

Provinces of the Solomon Islands
Guadalcanal
States and territories established in 1981